Joshua Goldberg may refer to:

 Joshua L. Goldberg (1896–1994), Belarusian-born American rabbi
 Joshua N. Goldberg (1925–2020), American physicist
 Joshua Ryne Goldberg (born 1995), American internet troll convicted of attempting a bombing